Vittorugo Mallucci is a former Italian racing driver. He drove 13 races between 1934 and 1954, mainly in Fiats and Ferraris, his best results being two second places and one third place. After his retirement he founded Industrial Cooling Vittorugo Mallucci, a company that produced frozen food and canned food. It was declared bankrupt in March 2012, after being incorporated into and sold to various other companies over the years, because the dependence on the group Nestle had become unsustainable.

Complete racing results

References 

Possibly living people
Year of birth missing
Date of birth unknown
Italian racing drivers
Mille Miglia drivers